NGC 4683 is a barred lenticular galaxy located about 170 million light-years away in the constellation Centaurus. It was discovered by astronomer John Herschel on June 8, 1834. NGC 4683 is a member of the Centaurus Cluster.

See also 
 List of NGC objects (4001–5000)

References

External links

Centaurus (constellation)
Barred lenticular galaxies
4683
43182
Centaurus Cluster
Astronomical objects discovered in 1834